Avaz may refer to:

 Avaz (music), unmetered vocal section of a mode in Persian music
 Avaz (album), 2005 rock album by the Turkish band Replikas
 Avaz app, a communication app for children with autism and communication disabilities
 Avaz Temirkhan (born 1959), Azerbaijani politician

Places 
 Avaz, Iran, a city in Fars Province
 Avaz, Razavi Khorasan, a village in Razavi Khorasan Province, Iran
 Avaz, South Khorasan, a village in South Khorasan Province, Iran

See also
 
 Awaz (disambiguation)
 Avaaz, a global civic organization
 Dnevni avaz, a newspaper in Bosnia and Herzegovina